Cercoptera is a genus of beetles in the family Cerambycidae, containing the following species:

 Cercoptera banonii Spinola, 1839
 Cercoptera sanguinicollis Gounelle, 1911

References

Trachyderini